Cosmopterix gloriosa is a moth in the family Cosmopterigidae. It was described by Edward Meyrick in 1922. It is found on Fiji.

References

Moths described in 1922
gloriosa